This article shows the rosters of all participating teams at the 2015 Memorial of Hubert Jerzy Wagner in Toruń, Poland.

The following is the French roster in the 2015 Memorial of Hubert Jerzy Wagner.

Head coach:  Laurent Tillie

The following is the Iranian roster in the 2015 Memorial of Hubert Jerzy Wagner.

Head coach:  Slobodan Kovač

The following is the Japanese roster in the 2015 Memorial of Hubert Jerzy Wagner.

Head coach: Masashi Nambu

The following is the Polish roster in the 2015 Memorial of Hubert Jerzy Wagner.

Head coach:  Stéphane Antiga

References

External links
Official website

Memorial of Hubert Jerzy Wagner squads